Marek Mach is a Slovak activist, entrepreneur, co-founder and chairman of civic association Mladí, who is known for founding of the Youth Against Fascism initiative (Mladí proti fašizmu, founded in 2016).

In 2018, Mach was awarded the 'Novinárska cena' Journalism Award for his article. published on Youth Against Fascism website. 

With Ondrej Vrábel, they have established civic association Mladí, which currently runs various charitable projects, including Dúhy.sk (Slovak social network for queer people), Youth Against Fascism (Mladí proti fašizmu), Youth For Climate (Mladí za klímu) and Youth News (Správy Mladí).

References 

Living people
Year of birth missing (living people)